Edgewater Presbyterian Church is a Christian church and member of the Presbyterian Church USA.  Located in the Edgewater neighborhood community area of Chicago, Illinois, the church is one of several historic buildings of the Bryn Mawr Historic District and is designed in the French Romanesque style.  It is celebrating its 125th anniversary having been founded by 43 charter members on June 9,1896. It dedicated an upgraded sanctuary on June 13, 2021,  and will have another anniversary celebration on September 26, 2021.  The congregation  welcomes all people, and values its diversity in cultural, racial ethnic, economic and sexual orientation identities. The congregation expresses love for its neighbors by supporting Care for Real; preparing meals for Sarah's Circle; befriending and sharing Bible study with residents of Bryn Mawr Care; and offering our large building for community events and non-profit organizations.

External links
Edgewater Presbyterian Church web site
Statistical snapshot of Edgewater Presbyterian Church

Churches in Chicago
Presbyterian churches in Illinois
Presbyterian Church (USA) churches